Game of Hunting (Chinese: 猎场) is a 2017 Chinese television series directed and written by Jiang Wei, which focuses on the occupation of Headhunters. It stars Hu Ge as the protagonist. The series aired on Hunan TV from 6 November to 9 December 2017.

Synopsis
The premise follows persistent man Zheng Qiudong in the finance world as he navigates through business failures, economic pitfalls purposely set up by adversaries and unfortunate romances without losing his moral principles to become an elite of the financial world, described metaphorically as the “hunting ground”. After an unfortunate event, Zheng Qiudong's business falls apart and he has to start over from the beginning with the help of new alliances.

Cast

Main 

 Hu Ge as Zheng Qiudong
 An ordinary but ambitious and persistent man, who fell into a slump in both his career and love life.
 Johnny Chen as Lin Bai
 Zheng Qiudong's mentor in the finance industry, and good friend.
 Sun Honglei as Liu Liangti
 Zheng Qiudong's prison comrade and his mentor in life.
 Zhang Jiayi as Qu Fujing
 The first major client of Zheng Qiudong.
 Zu Feng as Bai Liqin
 Zheng Qiudong's university best friend and later rival, who becomes involved in Zheng Qiudong and Luo Yiren's relationship.
  as Yuan Kun
 Zheng Qiudong's rival in work. A crafty man who would resort to underhanded means to achieve his goal.
 Hu Bing as Chen Xiufeng
 A capable finance executive, who is one of Zheng Qiudong's prime target.
 Jian Renzi as Luo Yiren
 Zheng Qiudong's first girlfriend who stayed by his side and encouraged him.
 Wan Qian as Xiong Qingchun
 A composed, quick-thinking and capable businesswoman. She is Zheng Qiudong's best right-hand woman at work and later becomes his second girlfriend.
 Zhang Lingzhi as Jia Yimei
 Zheng Qiudong's third girlfriend.

Supporting 

 Dong Yong as Yuan Tao
 A policeman.
 Li Naiwen as Chen Xiang
 A mysterious businessman.
 Du Jiang as Kai Wenyang
 Zhao Lixin as Yu Fangzhi
 Xu Ge as Hui Chenggong
 Zheng Qiudong's subordinate.
 Maggie Qin as Ma Xiaohong
 Zheng Qiudong's subordinate.
 Ke Lan as Gui Huang
 Luo Haiqiong as Jian Na
 Wang Qian as Hai Shan
 Ma Yuan as Yu Chengfei
 Zhang Ziyan as Qu Yunfeng
 Qu Fujing's daughter.
 Jiang Shan as Zhou Shuanghe
 Yuan Ran as Feng Juanjuan
 Xu Xiaofeng as Mi Na
 Wang Lejun as Tao Huamei
 Zhou Fang as Zhou Zhunlan
 Zhu Jie as Tan Fei
 Zhou Chengqi

Production
The script was named one of the Outstanding Scripts in 2015 by SARFT.
The series is directed and written by Jiang Wei, who has worked on several critically acclaimed television series like Lurk and Borrow Gun.

Soundtrack

Ratings 

 Highest ratings are marked in red, lowest ratings are marked in blue

Awards and nominations

References

External links
 Game of Hunting on Douban

Chinese drama television series
2017 Chinese television series debuts
2017 Chinese television series endings